The ABQ BioPark (or Albuquerque Biological Park) is an environmental museum located in Albuquerque, New Mexico. It contains four separate facilities:

 ABQ BioPark Aquarium - An aquarium with a  ocean tank containing Gulf of Mexico saltwater species from estuaries, surf zone, shallow waters, coral reefs, and ocean, as well as many other exhibits.
 ABQ BioPark Botanic Garden - A  botanic garden that includes a  glass conservatory housing plants from desert and Mediterranean climate zones.
Elephants, giraffes, lions, tigers, snow leopards, polar bears, hippos, gorillas, chimpanzees, zebras, along with more unusual animals such as hyenas, white rhinos, Tasmanian devils, wombats and African wild dogs. There is a variety of birds, from storks and eagles to roadrunners.
 Tingley Beach - fishing lake, model boating lake, picnic areas, narrow gauge railroad, and paths.

The ABQ BioPark is an accredited member of the Association of Zoos and Aquariums (AZA).

City records indicate more than 1,100 animals are in the BioPark's care during the fiscal year (as of December 2016).

The ABQ BioPark also operates a 36" narrow gauge railroad that connects these facilities. Trains are not running at this time due to COVID-19.

The Albuquerque Biopark has been without its train for almost two years, however there is a new plan in mind which includes a new electric tram speed that will take visitors between the zoo, botanical gardens and aquarium.  The BioPark train, a popular part of the BioPark experience, has been gone for almost two years. The new electric tram will transport about 60 people from the zoo to the aquarium in a few minutes. The electric tram is set to stay on track, starting from the zoo, to Tingley beach, then to the botanical gardens.

See also 
 List of botanical gardens in the United States
 List of zoos in the United States
 List of aquariums in the United States

Notes

External links 

Botanical gardens in New Mexico
Parks in Bernalillo County, New Mexico